Léon Charles Prudent Van Hove (10 February 1924 – 2 September 1990) was a Belgian physicist and a Director General of CERN. He developed a scientific career spanning mathematics, solid state physics, elementary particle and nuclear physics to cosmology.

Biography
Van Hove studied mathematics and physics at the Université Libre de Bruxelles (ULB). In 1946 he received his PhD in mathematics at the ULB. From 1949 to 1954 he worked at the Institute for Advanced Study in Princeton, New Jersey by virtue of his meeting with Robert Oppenheimer. Later he worked at the Brookhaven National Laboratory and was a professor and Director of the Theoretical Physics Institute at the University of Utrecht in the Netherlands. In the 1950s he laid the theoretical foundations for the analysis of inelastic neutron scattering in terms of the dynamic structure factor. In 1958, he was awarded the Francqui Prize in Exact Sciences. In 1959, he received an invitation to become the head of the Theory Division at CERN in Geneva. In 1975 Prof. Van Hove was appointed CERN Director-General, with John Adams, responsible for the research activities of the Organization. The LEP project was proposed during Van Hove's tenure as Director General.

Awards
 Francqui Prize, 1958
 Dannie Heineman Prize for Mathematical Physics, 1962
 Member, American Academy of Arts and Sciences, 1964
 Max Planck Medal, 1974
 Member, United States National Academy of Sciences, 1980
 Member, American Philosophical Society, 1980
There is a square, Square Van Hove, named after Van Hove at CERN, Geneva, Switzerland.

See also
 Quark–gluon plasma
 Quasielastic scattering
 Quasielastic neutron scattering
 List of Directors General of CERN
 Théophile de Donder
 Hilbrand J. Groenewold for the Groenewold–Van Hove theorem

References

External links
 Léon Van Hove Biography. Cern official website.
 Proc. Am. Phil. Soc. 136, 603 (1992)
 Scientific publications of Léon Van Hove on INSPIRE-HEP

1924 births
1990 deaths
Belgian nuclear physicists
Belgian academics
People associated with CERN
Particle physicists
Theoretical physicists
Free University of Brussels (1834–1969) alumni
Mathematical physicists
Foreign associates of the National Academy of Sciences
Winners of the Max Planck Medal
Academic staff of Utrecht University

Members of the American Philosophical Society
Members of the Royal Swedish Academy of Sciences